The C&C 27 Mk V, or Mark V, is a Canadian sailboat, designed by the C&C Design Group led by Neil Gilbert and first built in 1984.

Despite its name, the C&C 27 Mk V was a new design, unrelated to the original C&C 27. The design was originally marketed by the manufacturer as the "new C&C 27", but is now usually referred to as the Mark V to differentiate it from the earlier C&C 27 Mark I, II, III and IV designs.

The C&C 26 Wave is a sailboat derived from the C&C 27 Mk V, but with a wing keel and shorter mast.

Production
The C&C 27 Mk V was built by C&C Yachts in Canada at Niagara-On-The-Lake and in the United States at the C&C plant in Rhode Island, but it is now out of production.

The boats were built at Niagara-On-The-Lake with serial number prefix ZCC and numbered from 001 to 169. The Rhode Island built boats have the serial number prefix CCY and number from 500 to 610.

Design

The Mark V was introduced to refresh the out-of-date, 1970-vintage styling of the earlier C&C 27 series and also to improve the manufacturing profitability of the boat. The previous C&C 27 series cost as much to built as the larger C&C boats, but commanded a lower retail price.

The C&C 27 Mk V is a small recreational keelboat, built predominantly of fibreglass. It has a masthead sloop rig and a fixed keel, available in standard fin and shoal draft. The design features a raked stem, a reverse transom and a transom-hung rudder controlled by a tiller. The fin keel version displaces  and carries  of lead ballast. The shoal draft keel version displaces  and carries  of ballast.

The design has a PHRF racing average handicap of 174 with a spinnaker and 192 without.

Operational history
In a Canadian Yachting review of the Mark V, Bryan Gooderham and Carol Nickle wrote, "The 27, produced at C&C's Niagara and Rhode Island plants, exhibits the high-quality construction we expect from Canada's largest boatbuilder."

In a review of the Mark V, Michael McGoldrick wrote, "It's a good sailing boat that will appeal to anyone looking for a C&C in the under 30 foot range, and which has a slightly more modern appearance than the models that were built in the 1970s."

See also
List of sailing boat types

Similar sailboats
Beneteau First 26
Beneteau First 265
C&C 26
Contessa 26
Discovery 7.9
Grampian 26
Herreshoff H-26
Hunter 26
Hunter 26.5
Hunter 260
Hunter 270
MacGregor 26
Mirage 26
Nash 26
Nonsuch 26
Outlaw 26
Parker Dawson 26
Pearson 26
Sandstream 26
Tanzer 26
Yamaha 26

References

External links

Keelboats
1980s sailboat type designs
Sailing yachts
Sailboat type designs by C&C Design
Sailboat types built by C&C Yachts